Qods Stadium is a football stadium in Hamedan, Iran.  It is currently used mostly for football matches, on club level by PAS Hamedan F.C. and Alvand Hamedan F.C. The stadium has a capacity of 8,000 spectators.

Saddam Hussein once bombed this stadium during a prayer on Qods Day at the time of the Iran–Iraq War.

References

Football venues in Iran
Buildings and structures in Hamadan Province
Sport in Hamadan Province